This article covers euro gold and silver commemorative coins issued by Azienda Autonoma Di Stato Filatelica E Numismatica. It also covers rare cases of collectors coins (coins not planned for normal circulation) minted using other precious metals.  It does not cover either the San Marino €2 commemorative coins or the Sammarinese scudo commemorative coins.

For euro gold and silver commemorative coins of other countries see Euro gold and silver commemorative coins.

2 Scudo
San Marino has adopted the Euro since 2002 as its currency, However, in a means to maintain its own cultural identity it continues to issue a gold commemorative coin in its former currency the scudo released with a value of 2 scudo.
Since there is a fixed exchange rate between the scudo and the euro and since the euro is San Marino's official currency the 2 scudo coins will be included in this article.

2002 coinage

2003 coinage

2004 coinage

2005 coinage

Notes

References

 

San Marino
Currencies of San Marino

fr:Pièces de collection en euro
nl:Meerwaardeherdenkingsmunt